Maryland elected its members October 2, 1826.

See also 
 1826 and 1827 United States House of Representatives elections
 List of United States representatives from Maryland

1826
Maryland
United States House of Representatives